District 23 of the Texas Senate is a senatorial district that currently serves a portion of Dallas county in the U.S. state of Texas. The current Senator from District 23 is Royce West.

In 1914, it was made up eleven counties in South Texas, including Duval County.  Archie Parr represented it from 1915-1934.

Top 5 biggest cities in district
District 23 has a population of 813,699 with 576,192 that is at voting age from the 2010 census.

Election history
Election history of District 23 from 1992.

Previous elections

2018

2014

2012

2008

2004

2002

1998

1994

1992

District officeholders

Notes

References

23
Dallas County, Texas